Eric Wignall (25 December 1932 – 2 January 1991) was an English cricketer. He played for Gloucestershire between 1952 and 1953.

References

External links

1932 births
1991 deaths
English cricketers
Gloucestershire cricketers
Cricketers from Greater London
People from Harrow, London